Karl Gottlieb von Windisch (January 28, 1725, Pressburg – March 30, 1793, Pressburg) was a Hungarian German writer who produced a series of letters that were published as "Briefe über den Schachspieler von Kempelen nebst drey Kupferstichen die diese berühmte Maschine vorstellen", translated as "Inanimate Reason; or a Circumstantial Account of That Astonishing Piece of Mechanism, M. de Kempelen's Chess-Player; Now Exhibiting at No. 9 Savile-Row, Burlington Gardens", following a series of performances of The Turk that he attended. The letters have been cited often since their publication in attempts to uncover the secret of the machine. Windisch spoke Slovak and Hungarian and was the first publisher of an academic Journal in Eastern Europe.

Bibliography

Editor of Journals 

 Pressburger Zeitung (1764–1773)
 Der Freund der Tugend (1767–1769)
 Pressburgisches Wochenblatt zur Ausbreitung der Künste und Wissenschaften (1771–1773)
 Ungrisches Magazin, oder Beyträge zur vaterländischen Geschichte, Erdbeschreibung, und Naturwissenschaft. 4 volumes (1781–1783, 1787)
 Neues Ungrisches Magazin (1791–1792)

Books 

 Hanswurst. Ein Lustspiel in einem Aufzuge. Pressburg, 1761
 Der vernünftige Zeitvertreiber. Pressburg, 1770
 Politische, geographische und historische Beschreibung des Königreichs Hungarn. Pressburg, 1772 (Anonym ersch.)
 Kurzgefasste Geschichte der Ungarn von den ältesten, bis auf die itzigen Zeiten... Pressburg, 1778
 Geographie des Königreichs Ungarn. Mit Kupfern und 2 illuminirten Karten. 2. volumes, Pressburg, 1780
 Betrachtung über den Tod Ihro Majestät Maria Theresia vor einer Versammlung, von einem Ungar. Pressburg, 1780
 Briefe über den Schachspieler des Hrn. von Kempelen nebst drey Kupferstichen die diese berühmte Maschine vorstellen, published by Chr. von Mechel, Pressburg, 1783 
 Geographie und Geschichte des Königreichs Ungarn für Juden. 3. edition. Pressburg, 1785
 Sammlung christlicher Lieder und Gesänge zum Gebrauche evangelischer Religionsverwandten. Pressburg, 1785
 Neues Gesang- und Gebetbuch zum gottesdienstlichen Gebrauche der evangelischen Gemeinde in Pressburg. Pressburg, 1788
 Geographie des Grossfürstenthums Siebenbürgen. Pressburg, 1790 [Verfasserschaft umstritten]
 Beschreibung der Feierlichkeiten bei der Krönung Seiner Kaiserl. Majestät Leopold des Zweiten zum ungarischen König den 15. Novemb. 1790. Pressburg

References 
 Andrea Seidler, "Stolz bin ich auf den Einfall, ein Ungrisches Magazin herauszugeben...". Die Korrespondenz des Karl Gottlieb Windisch. Wien, Univ., Habil.-Schr., 2003.
 Tom Standage, The Turk: The Life and Times of the Famous Eighteenth-Century Chess-Playing Machine. Walker and Company, New York City, 2002. 
 Gerald M. Levitt, The Turk, Chess Automaton. McFarland and Company Inc. Publishers, Jefferson, North Carolina, 2000.
 Fritz Valjavec, Karl Gottlieb von Windisch. Das Lebensbild eines südostdeutschen Bürgers d. Aufklärungszeit. Schick, München, 1936

Mayors of Bratislava
Hungarian businesspeople
18th-century Hungarian historians
Hungarian chess players
German chess players
History of chess
Chess automatons
Chess people
Hungarian-German people
Writers from Bratislava
1725 births
1793 deaths
German male writers